Nicholas Jowin Sherman known professionally as Nick Sherman is an Oji-Cree singer-songwriter from Thunder Bay, Ontario.

Early life 
Nick Sherman was born in 1987 and raised in Sioux Lookout, Ontario where he became involved with the small punk scene at a young age, which has informed his music.

Sherman's music is inspired by his trips up to North Caribou Lake First Nation where his grandfather would take him trapping, play his guitar, and sing.  Sherman attended the Winnipeg Business College where he studied broadcasting before starting his career at CBC Radio in Thunder Bay.

Career 
Nick Sherman was featured by Voyage North and Superior Morning on the CBC Thunder Bay's 40th anniversary broadcast, and also featured in the live performance for the anniversary. Sherman also participated in CBC's Unreserved Indigenous Music Mentorship Program.

In 2012, Sherman released his debut album Drag Your Words Through, which had been preceded by "Winterdark", a single from the album. The album was supported with funding from the Ontario Arts Council.

In 2015, Sherman released a promotional single, "Ghost Town" from his upcoming sophomore album Knives & Wildrice. The album and its creation was discussed and deconstructed in a podcast of the same name on the Indian & Cowboy Podcast Network. Knives & Wildrice received the 2017 Indigenous Music Awards best folk album.

Sherman released his third full length album Made Of in 2019. Due to COVID-19, he has been unable to go on tour.

Next, he released a single entitled "Unbreakable" in 2020, accompanied by a music video, sponsored by the Aboriginal Peoples Television Network, in a series entitled Amplify.

The play, The Mush Hole, produced by Kaha:wi Dance Theatre, featured Nick Sherman's song “Find My Way” as part of the music score.

Personal life 
Nick Sherman is married to Ukrainian-Ojibwa artist Candace Twance. They have two children. He also has two brothers-in-law and two sisters-in-law.

Discography

Studio albums 

 Drag Your Words Through (2012)
 Knives & Wildrice (2015)
 Made Of (2019)

Singles 

 Winterdark (2012)
 Ghost Town (2015)
Unbreakable (2020)

Concerts 
 Aboriginal Awareness Week Concert
Calgary Folk Festival
Northern Lights Festival Boréal
Toronto Indigenous Arts Festival
4th Annual Maadaadizi Orientation
Live on the Waterfront presented by Ontario Power Generation
3rd Annual Weengushk International Film Festival
PRAS Summer Festival 2019
Definitely Superior Art Gallery
Keewaytinook High School Graduation
The Sioux Mountain Music Festival

References

External links 

1987 births
Musicians from Thunder Bay
People from Sioux Lookout
Living people
Cree people
First Nations musicians
20th-century Canadian male singers